The Football Conference season of 1998–99 was the twentieth season of the Football Conference.

Changes since the previous season
 Doncaster Rovers (relegated from the Football League 1997–98)
 Barrow (promoted 1997–98)
 Forest Green Rovers (promoted 1997–98)
 Kingstonian (promoted 1997–98)

Locations

Final  league table

Results

Top scorers in order of league goals

 Source:
 Footballtransfers.co.uk, thefootballarchives.com and Soccerbase contain information on many playerson whom there is not yet an article in Wikipedia.

References

External links
 Official Football Conference Website
 1998–99 Conference National Results

1998-99
5